KCLQ (107.9 FM, "107.9 The Coyote") is a radio station broadcasting a country music format. Licensed to Lebanon, Missouri, United States, the station is currently owned by Go Productions LLC. The Coyote is home to The Crystal and The Bear Show, Jamie Turner and James Clay in the afternoon.

References

External links
 

CLQ
Country radio stations in the United States
Radio stations established in 1983